The UAAP Badminton Championship is a badminton tournament on the Philippines for university teams.

Results

Streaks
 UP owns the longest streak for most number of consecutive titles in the Women's Division at six. NU also currently holds six straight titles in the Men's Division.
 UP also won "double crown" (winning both Men's and Women's) for four consecutive years (1997–2000). Ateneo have two double crowns in 2003–2004 and 2013–2014, while FEU achieved the feat in the 2006–2007 Season.

Number of championships by school

References
http://tiraue.wordpress.com/2010/08/20/uaap-season-73-badminton-tournament/
http://badmintonequipment.info/site/badminton-uaap/

Badminton
Badminton in the Philippines
Badminton tournaments in the Philippines
Sports competitions in the Philippines